Nargis (1929–1981) was Indian actress.

Nargis may also refer to:

People
Nargis (actress) (born 1976), Pakistani actress
Nargis Fakhri (born 1979), American model and actress
Nargiz Zakirova (born 1970), Russian rock singer
Nargis Ali (born 1965), Pakistani politician

Other uses
Nargis, Loiret, commune in the Loiret department in north-central France
Cyclone Nargis, cyclone which devastated the Irrawaddy Delta and the city of Yangon in 2008
Narcissus poeticus, a flower also known as "Nargis"
Nargis (film), a 1946 Bollywood film